Tamar Janine Reilly (born September 19, 1963), known professionally as Alexandra Silk, is an American pornographic actress, pornographic director and adult model.

Biography 
A graduate of the State University of New York at Albany, Silk began her adult career as a stripper in Las Vegas. During this time she met porn star Jenna Jameson, who advised her on how to enter the pornographic industry. Silk made her way to Hollywood, where she met Ron Jeremy, who in turn introduced her to performers, directors and producers.

During the course of her career she married porn star Luc Wylder.

She is a member of the Free Speech Coalition, the National Coalition for Sexual Freedom, the Society for the Scientific Study of Sexuality, and a supporting member of the American Association of Sexuality Educators, Counselors, and Therapists (AASECT).  By February 2010, Silk had completed her internship to become a certified sex surrogate with the International Professional Surrogate Association (IPSA), and names this as her true calling.

Awards

Wins
2008 AVN Hall of Fame
2013 XRCO Hall of Fame

Nominations

1999 XRCO Award – Unsung Siren
2000 AVN Female Performer of the Year
2002 AVN Best Anal Sex Scene – Film for Taken (with Herschel Savage)
2004 AVN Best Actress – Video for Stud Hunters

References

External links 

 
 
 
 

1963 births
American female erotic dancers
American erotic dancers
American female adult models
American pornographic film actresses
American pornographic film directors
Women pornographic film directors
Living people
People from Long Island
Pornographic film actors from New York (state)
University at Albany, SUNY alumni
Sex-positive feminists
21st-century American women